Dulhan Banoo Mein Teri is a 1999 Indian film. It was produced and directed by B. Subhash. The film stars Faraaz Khan and Deepti Bhatnagar in lead roles.

Synopsis 
Deepak Raj (Faraaz Khan), son of a London-based NRI Kuldeep Rai (Dalip Tahil) and Kashi (Beena), visits India with his friend little Jack (Johnny Lever), a music composer, where he meets Radha (Deepti Bhatnagar), a simple flower girl. They fall in love but are thwarted by  Minister Sukhdev (Pramod Moutho) and Rustogi (Arun Bakshi) both friends of Kuldeep Rai.

Cast 
 Faraaz Khan as Deepak Raj
 Deepti Bhatnagar as Radha "Rani"
 Dalip Tahil as Kuldeep Rai
 Beena as Kashi
 Johny Lever as Jack
 Pramod Moutho as Minister Sukhdev
 Arun Bakshi as Rustogi

Soundtrack

External links
 

1990 films
1990s Hindi-language films
Films scored by Raamlaxman